Jodi Hermanek is an American softball coach who is the current head coach at Pittsburgh.

Coaching career

Southern Utah

Ohio

Pittsburgh
On August 7, 2018, Jodi Hermanek was announced as the new head coach of the Pittsburgh softball program. Hermanek replaces Holly Aprile who left to take the same position at Louisville.

Head coaching record

College

References

Living people
Female sports coaches
American softball coaches
CSU Pueblo ThunderWolves softball players
CSU Pueblo ThunderWolves softball coaches
Southern Utah Thunderbirds softball coaches
Ohio Bobcats softball coaches
Pittsburgh Panthers softball coaches
Year of birth missing (living people)